WKWN (1420 AM) is a radio station broadcasting both a News Talk Information and an oldies format. It is licensed to Trenton, Georgia, and is currently owned by Dade County Broadcasting, Inc.

Programming
WKWN features programming from Fox News Radio, Salem Communications and Westwood One including Mike Gallagher, and Todd Starnes. Alongside sister station WFLI, WKWN airs Dick Bartley's Classic Hits, The Wolfman Jack Radio Show, The Rick and Bubba Show, Dick Clark's Rock, Roll & Remember, and American Top 40 The 70's with Casey Kasem.

FM Translator
WKWN has an FM translator, in addition to the main station at 1420 kHz. This FM translator is used to widen the broadcast area and provide better nighttime coverage.

History
The station went on the air as WADX on April 10, 1981. On November 6, 1995, the station changed its call sign to the current WKWN.

References

External links
 Official website
 WKWN Twitter
 KWN News Now Facebook

KWN